Baldwin Mwanakumabu Nkumbula (died 27 August 1995) was a Zambian politician and a son of veteran politician Harry Nkumbula. He served in Frederick Chiluba's Movement for Multi-Party Democracy government as Minister of Sports from 1991 until August 1992 when he resigned, citing rampant corruption. He was a co-founder of the National Party and became its president. He was also a wealthy entrepreneur and was considered a strong contender for president of Zambia.

He was married to Chifunilo Chembe and had three children; Harry Mwaanga Nkumbula, Mundusu Nkumbula and Mwanida Nkumbula.

He died in a car accident in August 1995 when the Mercedes he was driving overturned en route to Ndola from Kitwe. President Chiluba's son, Castro, and another friend Defense Minister Benjamin Yorum Mwilas' nephew Mubanga Kafuti were passengers in the vehicle and both survived the crash with injuries.

External links
 World Bank article

Year of birth missing
1995 deaths
Sport, Youth and Child Development ministers of Zambia
United National Independence Party politicians
Road incident deaths in Zambia
Movement for Multi-Party Democracy politicians
National Party (Zambia) politicians
Members of the National Assembly of Zambia